KMEG (channel 14) is a television station in Sioux City, Iowa, United States, affiliated with the digital multicast network Dabl. It is owned by Waitt Broadcasting, which maintains a shared services agreement (SSA) with Sinclair Broadcast Group, owner of Fox/MyNetworkTV/CBS affiliate KPTH (channel 44), for the provision of certain services. The two stations share studios along I-29 (postal address says Gold Circle) in Dakota Dunes, South Dakota; KMEG's transmitter is located in unincorporated Plymouth County, Iowa, east of James and US 75 along the Woodbury County line.

History
The station signed on September 5, 1967, as the market's third television outlet. It has been affiliated with CBS since the beginning. Before its launch, the network had previously been carried on KVTV (channel 9, now KCAU-TV) from 1953 until 1967. That station switched its affiliation to ABC on September 2, 1967, and Siouxland was briefly without a CBS affiliate until KMEG signed on three days later. KMEG was started by a group of local investors led by Bob and Norma Donovan. Its call letters were selected in honor of their daughter Meg who would later pass away.

The station's original ownership group sold KMEG to John Fetzer in 1969. Fetzer sold off all of his broadcasting properties in the mid-1980s. KMEG was among the last to be divested, going to Gillett Holdings in 1985. The next year, Gillett sold the station to the Maine Radio and Television Company, the owner of WCSH-TV in Portland, Maine, and WLBZ-TV in Bangor, Maine. KMEG was one of only two CBS stations not to air the Late Show with David Letterman when it premiered. KXJB-TV in Fargo, North Dakota, also declined to alter its syndicated lineup in order to air the new program. (CBS programming is now seen in Fargo on KXJB-LD/KVLY-DT2.) This led Sioux City to become known as the Late Shows first home office. KMEG began airing the show in 1994.

Maine Radio and Television merged with Gannett in 1998. However, KMEG was not included in the deal; it was acquired by Waitt Broadcasting later in 1998. This gave its analog signal on UHF channel 14 a signal comparable to those of KCAU and KTIV (channel 4), spanning 23 counties in northwestern Iowa, northeastern Nebraska, and southeastern South Dakota. Previously, its over-the-air signal was effectively limited to Sioux City itself and the immediate metro area; most of the market had needed cable to get an acceptable signal.

Around the same time Waitt bought KMEG, the company also purchased Fox affiliates WFXL in Albany, Georgia, WPGX in Panama City, Florida, WDFX-TV in Dothan, Alabama, and KYOU-TV in Ottumwa, Iowa. In 2003, Waitt Broadcasting merged with Raycom Media (who concurrently transferred KYOU's license to a third party due to Federal Communications Commission (FCC) duopoly regulations, as Raycom already owned Ottumwa's ABC affiliate KTVO at the time); however, KMEG was not included in the merger and was instead spun off to a new locally based owner that took the Waitt Broadcasting licensee name.

From 1988 until the sign-on of KPTH in early 1999, the station maintained a secondary affiliation with Fox, airing the network's prime time programming out-of-pattern during the late night hours (and beginning in 1994, the network's NFL package); the network's programming was available in-pattern via the network's affiliates in Sioux Falls, Omaha and Des Moines, all of which served the market's outlying areas. It also aired selected UPN programming out-of-pattern until the network merged with The WB (carried locally on KTIV-DT2 and cable television) to form The CW in 2006.

KMEG's first studios were at the corner of 7th Street and Floyd Boulevard in Downtown Sioux City until around the start of the 21st century when it moved into new facilities in Dakota Dunes near North Sioux City, South Dakota. The  building was constructed by Darland Construction Company, and at the time, the building housed KMEG and two radio stations (KZSR 102.3 FM and KKYY 101.3 FM). In May 2005, Waitt Broadcasting entered into a shared services agreement (SSA) with Pappas Telecasting, then-owner of KPTH—a rare instance of a Big Three affiliate being junior partner in such an arrangement. The two radio stations moved out and KPTH was integrated into KMEG's facility even though it was the senior partner.

In November 2007, Waitt announced it would sell KMEG to Siouxland Television, LLC. Pappas was to have continued operating the station as part of the deal. However, KPTH was among Pappas' thirteen stations which filed for Chapter 11 bankruptcy protection. As a result, the sale of KMEG to Siouxland Television fell through. On January 16, 2009, it was announced that several of the Pappas stations involved in the bankruptcy (including KPTH) would be sold to New World TV Group after the transaction received United States bankruptcy court approval. The change in ownership was completed on October 15, 2009, and on that day, New World TV Group took over the SSA with KMEG. TTBG announced the sale of most of its stations, including KPTH and the SSA of KMEG, to the Sinclair Broadcast Group on June 3, 2013. The sale was completed on September 30.

On January 20, 2021, KPTH announced that CBS programming would move to its third subchannel, effective February 4, ending 54 years of the CBS affiliation on KMEG. To accommodate the switch, Charge! moved to the second subchannel of KMEG, replacing TBD, which joined MyNetworkTV on KPTH's second subchannel. Dabl programming moved to the first subchannel of KMEG, making it the primary affiliate.

On July 28, 2021, the FCC issued a Forfeiture Order stemming from a lawsuit against KMEG owner Waitt Broadcasting. The order came six months after KMEG lost its CBS affiliation. The lawsuit, filed by AT&T, alleged that Waitt failed to negotiate for retransmission consent in good faith for KMEG. Owners of other Sinclair-managed stations, such as Deerfield Media, were also named in the lawsuit. Waitt was ordered to pay a fine of $512,228.

Newscasts

When it signed on, KMEG broadcast newscasts under the name Newsbeat 14. It made little headway in the ratings, however. Not only did it have to contend with long-established KTIV and KCAU, but it also had to compete against KELO-TV in Sioux Falls, one of the strongest CBS affiliates in the nation. Also, as mentioned above, its signal was nowhere near as strong as its competition; much of the area wouldn't be able to get an adequate signal from the station until cable arrived in the 1980s. By the late 1970s, KMEG had closed its news department. For the next two decades, it was one of the few Big Three affiliates without a newscast; the only local news came in the form of cut-ins and updates.

After being acquired by Waitt Broadcasting in 1998, KMEG revived evening and late-night local news as KMEG News. On October 9, 2006, KMEG began producing a weeknight prime time newscast on KPTH. Known as Siouxland News at Nine on Fox 44, the broadcast can currently be seen for thirty minutes. Although KPTH is the senior partner in the SSA, KMEG produces the newscasts on both stations. On October 25, 2010, KMEG became the first station in the market to upgrade its news operation to 16:9 enhanced definition widescreen. Although not truly high definition, the broadcasts matched the ratio of HD television screens. The weeknight news at 9 on KPTH was included in the change. On April 15, 2013, KMEG and KPTH completed an upgrade to full high definition news broadcasts, two years after competitors KCAU-TV and KTIV.

In November 2015, KMEG brought back a weekend newscast at 10 p.m.

Technical information

Subchannels
The station's digital signal is multiplexed:

Analog-to-digital conversion
KMEG shut down its analog signal, over UHF channel 14, at noon on February 17, 2009, which had originally been the date of the federally mandated transition from analog to digital television. Earlier that year, the date of the transition had been moved to June 12. The station's digital signal remained on its pre-transition UHF channel 39, using PSIP to display KMEG's virtual channel as 14 on digital television receivers.

Translators
KMEG's signal is repeated over two translators.

References

External links
KMEG/KPTH (can be entered into web-enabled mobile device for wireless access)

Television channels and stations established in 1967
1967 establishments in Iowa
MEG
Dabl affiliates
Charge! (TV network) affiliates
Comet (TV network) affiliates
Stadium (sports network) affiliates
Sinclair Broadcast Group